Dora Askowith (August 30, 1884 - October 23, 1958) was a Lithuanian-born American college professor, author and historian. She was director of the Women’s Organization for the American Jewish Congress.

Life 
She was born in Kovno. She graduated from Barnard College and Columbia University. From 1912 to 1957, she taught at Hunter College.

For a short period in the 1920s, Askowith studied at Rabbinical school, although ordination was denied to female students.

Works 
The toleration and persecution of the Jews in the Roman empire: Part I: The Toleration of the Jews Under Julius Caesar and Augustus (1915) 
A Call to the Jewish Women of America (c. 1917) 
“Prolegomena: Legal Fictions or Evasions of the Law” in Jewish Studies in Memory of Israel Abrahams  (1927)
"The Life and Work of Luigi Luzzatti" in God in Freedom: Studies in the Relations Between Church and State (1930) 
Three outstanding women, Mary Fels, Rebekah Kohut [and] Annie Nathan Meyer(1941) 
The purchase of Louisiana (1953)

References

External links 
 Jenna Weissman Joselit, A Tale of Two Flags, Confederate and Zionist, Forward, August 8, 2015

1884 births
1958 deaths
American historians
Jewish scholars
Barnard College alumni
Hunter College faculty
American Jews
Women rabbinical students